Ray Butler (born June 28, 1956) is a retired American football wide receiver.

College career
Butler played college football at the University of Southern California. He played in a total of 25 games for USC in 1978 and 1979 as a wide receiver and return specialist. He caught a total of 30 passes for 451 yards (but no touchdowns), and returned a total of 48 punts for 474 yards (and 1 touchdown), and 37 kickoffs for 723 yards.

Professional career
Butler played in the National Football League between 1980 and 1988. In 1981, his peak year, he was fourth in the league with 9 receiving touchdowns. His lifetime total number of touchdowns was 37.  After being drafted 88th overall, in the 4th round of the 1980 draft by the Baltimore Colts, he played for the club through their move to Indianapolis until the last two games of the 1985 season, when he played with the Seattle Seahawks, his team through 1988.

Post-NFL career
Butler resides in Texas, where he has coached high school football at KIPP Academy and Sweeny High School, and is wide receiver coach for the Texas A&T Drillers.

References

1956 births
Living people
People from Victoria, Texas
American football wide receivers
USC Trojans football players
Baltimore Colts players
Indianapolis Colts players
Seattle Seahawks players